Atlas Preparatory School is a middle school and high school in Colorado Springs, Colorado.

Recognition

Atlas Preparatory School was honored by the Colorado Department of Education as a "Center of Excellence" in 2010 and in 2018.

References

Atlas Student Portal

High schools in Colorado Springs, Colorado
Charter schools in Colorado